Romeo Saturnino Brawner Jr. (born March 18, 1968) is a Philippine Army general who has served as the 65th Commanding General of the Philippine Army since December 7, 2021. Prior to his appointment on the post, Brawner previously served as the commander of the 4th Infantry Division in Northern Mindanao.

Early life and education
Brawner was born in Baguio to Lenora Fe (née Saturnino) and Romeo A.Brawner, Sr., the brother of former  Brigadier General Felix A. Brawner Jr. Brawner's military roots came from his grandfather, Private Lisbon Brawner, an African-American soldier who served from the United States Army, and was part of the Buffalo Soldiers who served during the Philippine–American War.

Brawner finished high school at the University of the Philippines Baguio before graduating from the Philippine Military Academy as part of the Makatao Class of 1989 earning his commission as an army second lieutenant. Brawner also holds a Masters in Information Management from Ateneo de Manila University, a Masters in Business Administration from the Asian Institute of Management, and subsequently from the European School of Management in Oxford University, and a Masters in Strategic Studies from the United States Army War College. Brawner also topped his class after completing the Intelligence Officer Course, the Special Forces Operations Course, and the AFP Comptrollership Course, as well completing the Advance Security Cooperation Course, located at the Asia-Pacific Center for Security Studies in Hawaii. In 2011, Brawner served as the Philippine Army representative during the United States Visitor Leadership Program (IVLP) on Foreign Policy, as well as during the IVLP on Cyber Security in 2013.

Military career
As a junior officer, Brawner participated in military operations against the communist insurgents and Muslim separatists and terrorists in the Philippines. Throughout his career, Brawner served primarily in both infantry and special operations, before being placed in staff positions. Brawner  was named as Battalion Commander of the 2nd Special Forces Battalion, before being an Operations Officer under the Special Forces Regiment (Airborne). Brawner also served as the Chief of Staff of the 6th Infantry Division, and was also named Chief of Public Affairs of the AFP, before serving as the AFP Spokesperson. Brawner eventually became commander of the Civil-Military Operations Regiment of the Philippine Army.

During the Siege of Marawi in 2017, Brawner subsequently served as spokesperson and deputy commander of Task Force Ranao, and served as one of the key generals during the 5-month long battle. Brawner would be later conferred a Commendation Medal and Ribbon for his role. The following year, in 2018, Brawner took command of the 103rd Infantry Brigade under the 1st Infantry Division, and was tasked to root out the remnants of the Islamic State-associated militant terrorist organization Maute Group and its allies within Western Mindanao, including the death of Owayda Marohombsar, also known as Abu Dar, and was the successor of Isnilon Hapilon as the head of the Islamic State-linked terrorists, and the last remaining leader who escaped the Battle of Marawi and was neutralized after follow-up operations.  Due to his accomplishment, Brawner was awarded the Order of Lapu-Lapu by President Rodrigo Duterte. In the aftermath of the Death of Darwin Dormitorio due to hazing, Brawner was named the acting-Commandant of Cadets of the Philippine Military Academy in 2019, along with Rear Admiral Allan Ferdinand Cusi as its superintendent officer-in-charge, and led to the resignation of their predecessors, then-Brigadier General Bartolome Vicente Bacarro as Commandant of Cadets, and Lieutenant General Ronnie Evangelista as PMA Superintendent. Brawner later served his term in full capacity as Commandant of Cadets.

In December 2020, Brawner was named as the first Deputy Chief of Staff for Financial Management after its foundation on 5 November 2020, which is in charge of the AFP's financial control, budgeting, and fiscal management, upon the approval of the Chief of Staff of the Armed Forces of the Philippines. On July 1, 2021, Brawner was named commander of the 4th Infantry Division, in charge with counterinsurgency operations in Northern Mindanao and Caragaregions. During his tenure as division commander of the 4th Infantry Division, Brawner finalized and oversaw a military operation under his supervision that led to the death of communist insurgent leader Jorge Madlos on October 31, 2021, in the outskirts of Impasugong, Bukidnon. Madlos, commonly known as Ka Oris, was the spokesperson of the New People's Army National Operational Command and the National Democratic Front.

Brawner was appointed the 65th Commanding General of the Philippine Army by President Rodrigo Duterte on December 7, 2021, and was eventually promoted to the rank of Lieutenant General on 27 December 2021.

Personal life
Brawner is married to Melody Valeros and they have three children.

References

External links 

Living people
People from Ifugao
Philippine Military Academy alumni
Philippine Army generals
1968 births